Mikhail Anatolyevich Golikov (born 21 November 1969) is a former Russian football player.

Club career
He made his Russian Premier League debut for FC Asmaral Moscow on 7 March 1993 in a game against FC Spartak Vladikavkaz. He played one more season on the top level with FC Shinnik Yaroslavl.

References

1969 births
Living people
Soviet footballers
FC FShM Torpedo Moscow players
Russian footballers
FC Volgar Astrakhan players
FC Asmaral Moscow players
Russian Premier League players
FC Shinnik Yaroslavl players
FC Moscow players
FC Neftyanik Ufa players
Association football forwards
FC Dynamo Vologda players